Karte Sakhi is a district in Afghanistan located in Kabul.

See also 
 Sakhi Shrine
 March 2018 Kabul suicide bombing

Note 

Neighborhoods of Kabul